Bucculatrix comporabile is a moth in the family Bucculatricidae. It was described by Svetlana Seksjaeva in 1989. It is found in the Russian Far East (Primorsky Krai) and Japan (Hokkaido, Honshu).

The wingspan is 6–7 mm. The forewings are brown with brown patches. The hindwings are grey.

The larvae feed on Quercus crispula, Quercus dentata and possibly Quercus serrata. They mine the leaves of their host plant. The young larvae form a linear mine. Pupation takes place in a white cocoon.

References

External links
Natural History Museum Lepidoptera generic names catalog

Bucculatricidae
Moths described in 1989
Moths of Asia
Moths of Japan